Ackendorf is a village and a former municipality in the Börde district in Saxony-Anhalt, Germany. Since 1 January 2010, it is part of the municipality Hohe Börde.

Former municipalities in Saxony-Anhalt
Hohe Börde